William Haile may refer to:
William Haile (New Hampshire politician) (1807–1876), governor of New Hampshire
William Haile (Mississippi politician) (died 1837), U.S. Representative from Mississippi
William H. Haile, lieutenant governor of Massachusetts

See also
William Hale (disambiguation)